Fatma Rasim gizi Hajiyeva (born September 15, 1979) is a Doctor of Philosophy in Medicine, Head of the gynecology department of the Scientific Research Institute of Obstetrics and Gynecology.

Biography 
Fatma Hajiyeva was born on September 15, 1979, in Marneuli. She studied at Azerbaijan Medical University in 1995–2001. In 2019, she was awarded the title of associate professor of Obstetrics and Gynecology by the Supreme Attestation Commission under the President of the Republic of Azerbaijan.

References 

1979 births
Living people